Kalamandalam Sankara Warrier is an acclaimed Indian percussionist of the Kerala ethnic drum called maddalam, and has specialised in its playing for the dance-drama of Kathakali.

Personal life
Sankara Warrier was born on 1 June 1952, at Thillenkery, a small village in Kannur district of the Malabar region, to late Krishna Warrier and Madhavi Warrasiar. Currently, he lives with his wife Valsala S Warrier in Eloor near Kochi where he worked for 18 years as a maddalam teacher in FACT Kathakali School. The couple has two sons, Arun Deva Warrier and Kiran Deva Warrier. Arun is also a young maestro in maddalam.

Career
Sankara Warrier joined Kalamandalam at the age of 15 and was trained in maddalam under masters like Kalamandalam Appukutty Poduval and Kalamandalam Narayanan Nambeesan. After his four-year course. Warrier joined Kalamandalam as first grade maddalam teacher. In 1981, FACT (Fertilizers and Chemicals of Travancore Ltd) invited Warrier to join its Kathakali school as a maddalam teacher. Warrier worked in FACT Kathakali School for 18 years along with late masters such as Vaikom Karunakaran Nair, Kalamandalam Kesavan (chenda), Kalamandalam Sankaran Embranthiri and Kalamandalam Hyderali (Kathakali music). He retired in 2005. He has also gained name as a maddalam percussionist in the classical ensemble called Panchavadyam.

Literature in Maddalam
Sankara Warrier has written a pioneering book titled "Maddalam Enna Mangalavadyam", published in 2003 with the help of his alma mater.

See also
 Maddalam
 Kathakali
 Kalamandalam Appukutty Poduval
 Maddalam and Chenda Keli

External links

 
 
 
 
 

YouTube links
 
 
 
 
 
 

Kathakali exponents
1952 births
Living people
Indian drummers
Maddalam players
Musicians from Kannur
People from Kannur district
Indian male classical musicians
20th-century Indian  male musicians
20th-century drummers